Alessandro Calder (born 1 November 2001) is an Italian rower world champion at junior level at the World Rowing Junior Championships.

Achievements

References

External links
 

2001 births
Living people
Italian male rowers
21st-century Italian people